Nordic Aviation Capital (NAC) is an aircraft leasing company with offices in Ireland, Denmark, Singapore, Hong Kong, Beijing, Toronto and Fort Lauderdale, Florida. NAC owns the world's largest fleet of regional aircraft.

History

The company was founded in 1990 by Martin Møller Nielsen, and had its initial headquarters in Skive, Denmark.

In 2004, Nordic Aviation Capital moved its headquarters to Billund. A new office in Ireland was also opened in the same year.

In August 2015, the Swedish capital fund EQT Partners became the majority shareholder in NAC.

EQT Partners announced it would be putting up its 54% shareholding for sale in October 2018.

In January 2020, NAC opened its new headquarters in Limerick, Ireland.

Fleet

As of June 2021, the Nordic Aviation Capital fleet consists of the following aircraft:

Aircraft leasing

Tarom
Tarom has agreed to lease 9 ATR 72-600 aircraft from Nordic Aviation Capital, with deliveries expected from October 2019 until 2021. They are to replace existing ATR 42-500 and ATR 72-500 aircraft.

References

External links
 

Aircraft leasing companies
Danish companies established in 1990
1990 establishments in Denmark
Companies based in Billund Municipality